Guillermo Mario Coppola (born 8 January 1969) is an Argentinian retired footballer of Italian descent who played primarily as forward.

Club career
Born in Buenos Aires, Coppola began his career in 1987 at Club Atlético Platense. In 1990 he joined Polish I liga site GKS Katowice. He made his league debut in 0–1 defeat against Śląsk Wrocław on 16 March 1991. Representing the club in 1990–91 season Coppola made 8 league appearances without any goal scored, winning Polish Cup in the summer of 1991. In 1993, after a short spell with Deportivo Armenio, he retired from professional football.

Honours
GKS Katowice
 Polish Cup: 1990/91

References

External links
  
 Guillermo Coppola at BDFA 
 Guillermo Coppola at FootballDatabase.eu

Living people
1969 births
Argentine footballers
Association football forwards
Argentine expatriate footballers
Club Atlético Platense footballers
Deportivo Armenio footballers
GKS Katowice players
Ekstraklasa players
Argentine Primera División players
Expatriate footballers in Poland
Argentine expatriate sportspeople in Poland
Argentine sportspeople of Italian descent
Footballers from Buenos Aires